In combustion engineering and explosion studies, the Markstein number characterizes the effect of local heat release of a propagating flame on variations in the surface topology along the flame and the associated local flame front curvature. The dimensionless Markstein number is defined as:

The larger the Markstein length, the greater the effect of curvature on localised burning velocity. It is named after George H. Markstein (1911—2011), who showed that thermal diffusion stabilized the curved flame front and proposed a relation between the critical wavelength for stability of the flame front, called the Markstein length, and the thermal thickness of the flame. Phenomenological Markstein numbers with respect to the combustion products are obtained by means of the comparison between the measurements of the flame radii as a function of time and the results of the analytical integration of the linear relation between the flame speed and either flame stretch rate or flame curvature. The burning velocity is obtained at zero stretch, and the effect of the flame stretch acting upon it is expressed by a Markstein length. Because both flame curvature and aerodynamic strain contribute to the flame stretch rate, there is a Markstein number associated with each of these components.

Clavin–Williams equation

The Markstein number with respect to the unburnt gas mixture for a one step reaction in the limit of large activation energy asymptotics was derived by Paul Clavin and Forman A. Williams in 1982. The Markstein number then is

where 
 is the heat release parameter defined with density ratio,
 is the Zel'dovich number,
 is the Lewis number of the deficient reactant (either fuel or oxidizer)

and the Markstein number with respect to the burnt gas mixture is derived by Clavin (1985)

Second Markstein number

In general, Markstein number for the curvature effects  and strain effects  are not same in real flames. In that case, one defines a second Markstein number as

See also
 G equation
 Prandtl number
 Schmidt number

References

Combustion
Dimensionless numbers of fluid mechanics
Fluid dynamics
Dimensionless numbers
Dimensionless numbers of chemistry